Yury Aleksandrovich Zakharov (born March 30, 1938) is a Soviet and Russian chemist and professor. Rector of Kemerovo State University from 1978 to 2005.

He graduated from Tomsk State University in 1960. Ph.D. in Chemistry, Professor.

He's an author of numerous papers on solid-state chemistry.

He has been a member of United Russia since 2000.

In 2005 he quit the post of Rector, when he was indicted on bribery charges.

References

1938 births
20th-century Russian chemists
21st-century chemists
Living people
People from Anzhero-Sudzhensk
Corresponding Members of the Russian Academy of Sciences
Academic staff of Tomsk Polytechnic University
Tomsk State University alumni

Honoured Scientists of the Russian Federation
Recipients of the Order of Honour (Russia)
Recipients of the Order of the Red Banner of Labour
Russian chemists
Soviet chemists